The Hiram C. Stewart House is a historic Prairie School house designed by George W. Maher located at 521 Grant Street in Wausau, Wisconsin. It was added to the National Register of Historic Places on August 30, 1974.

Description and history
Stewart was a principal of Wausau's Barker and Stewart Lumber Company. In 1906, he had this house built from a design by Maher. It is generally Prairie Style, with horizontal lines and broad eaves. The exterior is stucco, and the interior is carefully designed too. Themes of a tulip and a tripartite arch repeat both inside and out, exemplifying Maher's "motif rhythm theory" of design.

The house currently serves as a bed and breakfast called the Stewart Inn.

References

Bed and breakfasts in Wisconsin
Houses in Marathon County, Wisconsin
Houses completed in 1906
Houses on the National Register of Historic Places in Wisconsin
Prairie School architecture in Wisconsin
National Register of Historic Places in Marathon County, Wisconsin
1906 establishments in Wisconsin